False Fathers is a 1929 American silent Western film directed by Horace B. Carpenter and starring Carpenter and Noah Beery.

Cast
 Noah Beery as Parson
 Horace B. Carpenter
 Francis Pomerantz
 E. A. Martin

References

Bibliography
 Connelly, Robert B. The Silents: Silent Feature Films, 1910-36, Volume 40, Issue 2. December Press, 1998.
 Munden, Kenneth White. The American Film Institute Catalog of Motion Pictures Produced in the United States, Part 1. University of California Press, 1997.

External links
 

1929 films
1929 Western (genre) films
American silent feature films
Silent American Western (genre) films
American black-and-white films
1920s English-language films
Films directed by Horace B. Carpenter
1920s American films